The 61st parallel north is a circle of latitude that is 61 degrees north of the Earth's equatorial plane. It crosses the Atlantic Ocean, Europe, Asia and North America.

At this latitude the sun is visible for 19 hours, 16 minutes during the summer solstice and 5 hours, 32 minutes during the winter solstice.

This latitude also roughly corresponds to the minimum latitude in which civil twilight can last all night near the summer solstice.

Around the world
Starting at the Prime Meridian and heading eastwards, the parallel 61° north passes through:

{| class="wikitable plainrowheaders"
! scope="col" width="125" | Co-ordinates
! scope="col" | Country, territory or ocean
! scope="col" | Notes
|-
| style="background:#b0e0e6;" | 
! scope="row" style="background:#b0e0e6;" | Atlantic Ocean
| style="background:#b0e0e6;" | Defines the border between North Sea and Norwegian Sea
|-
| 
! scope="row" | 
| Islands and skerries of, and Indrevær proper, Sogn og Fjordane
|-
| style="background:#b0e0e6;" | 
! scope="row" style="background:#b0e0e6;" | Atlantic Ocean
| style="background:#b0e0e6;" | Straumsfjorden, North Sea
|-
| 
! scope="row" | 
| Islands and skerries of, and Ytre Sula proper, Sogn og Fjordane
|-
| style="background:#b0e0e6;" | 
! scope="row" style="background:#b0e0e6;" | Atlantic Ocean
| style="background:#b0e0e6;" | Sognesjøen, North Sea
|-
| 
! scope="row" | 
| Hiserøyna, and the mainland Sogn og Fjordane, 
|-
| style="background:#b0e0e6;" | 
! scope="row" style="background:#b0e0e6;" | Atlantic Ocean
| style="background:#b0e0e6;" | Risnefjorden, Sognefjorden, North Sea
|-
| 
! scope="row" | 
| Sogn og Fjordane
|-
| style="background:#b0e0e6;" | 
! scope="row" style="background:#b0e0e6;" | Atlantic Ocean
| style="background:#b0e0e6;" | Aurlandsfjorden, Sognefjorden, North Sea
|-
| 
! scope="row" | 
| Sogn og Fjordane, Buskerud, Oppland, Hedmark
|-
| 
! scope="row" | 
|
|-
| style="background:#b0e0e6;" | 
! scope="row" style="background:#b0e0e6;" | Atlantic Ocean
| style="background:#b0e0e6;" | Gulf of Bothnia, Baltic Sea
|-
| 
! scope="row" | 
| Passing through Hämeenlinna,  
|-valign="top"
| 
! scope="row" | 
| Passing through Lake Ladoga, Lake Onega and by the approximate hypocentre of the 1908 Tunguska event
|-
| style="background:#b0e0e6;" | 
! scope="row" style="background:#b0e0e6;" | Pacific Ocean
| style="background:#b0e0e6;" | Gizhigin Bay, Sea of Okhotsk
|-
| 
! scope="row" | 
|
|-
| style="background:#b0e0e6;" | 
! scope="row" style="background:#b0e0e6;" | Pacific Ocean
| style="background:#b0e0e6;" | Penzhin Bay, Sea of Okhotsk
|-
| 
! scope="row" | 
| Kamchatka Peninsula
|-
| style="background:#b0e0e6;" | 
! scope="row" style="background:#b0e0e6;" | Pacific Ocean
| style="background:#b0e0e6;" | Bering Sea
|-
| 
! scope="row" | 
| Alaska
|-
| style="background:#b0e0e6;" | 
! scope="row" style="background:#b0e0e6;" | Pacific Ocean
| style="background:#b0e0e6;" | Cook Inlet, Gulf of Alaska
|-
| 
! scope="row" | 
| Alaska - Kenai Peninsula
|-
| style="background:#b0e0e6;" | 
! scope="row" style="background:#b0e0e6;" | Pacific Ocean
| style="background:#b0e0e6;" | Turnagain Arm, Cook Inlet, Gulf of Alaska
|-
| 
! scope="row" | 
| Alaska passing through the southern part of Anchorage
|-valign="top"
| 
! scope="row" | 
| Yukon Northwest Territories - passing through the Great Slave Lake Nunavut
|-
| style="background:#b0e0e6;" | 
! scope="row" style="background:#b0e0e6;" | Arctic Ocean
| style="background:#b0e0e6;" | Hudson Bay
|-
| 
! scope="row" | 
| Quebec - Ungava Peninsula Nunavut - Diana Island
|-
| style="background:#b0e0e6;" | 
! scope="row" style="background:#b0e0e6;" | Arctic Ocean
| style="background:#b0e0e6;" | Diana Bay, Hudson Strait
|-
| 
! scope="row" | 
| Quebec - Ungava Peninsula
|-
| style="background:#b0e0e6;" | 
! scope="row" style="background:#b0e0e6;" rowspan="2" | Arctic Ocean
| style="background:#b0e0e6;" | Hudson Strait
|-
| style="background:#b0e0e6;" | 
| style="background:#b0e0e6;" | Davis Strait
|-
| 
! scope="row" | 
|
|-valign="top"
| style="background:#b0e0e6;" | 
! scope="row" style="background:#b0e0e6;" | United Kingdom
| style="background:#b0e0e6;" | Passing just north of Out Stack, Muckle Flugga and Unst, Shetland Islands, 
|}

See also
60th parallel north
62nd parallel north

References

n61